{{DISPLAYTITLE:C28H41N3O3}}
The molecular formula C28H41N3O3 (molar mass: 467.643 g/mol, exact mass: 467.3148 u) may refer to:

 Oxetacaine
 Tiropramide

Molecular formulas